Țuglui is a commune in Dolj County, Oltenia, Romania with a population of 2,889 people. It is composed of two villages: Jiul and Țuglui.

References

Communes in Dolj County
Localities in Oltenia